Daphnella eocaenica  is an extinct species of sea snail, a marine gastropod mollusk in the family Raphitomidae.

Distribution
Fossils of this marine species were found in Eocene strata of Loire-Atlantique, France.

References

 Cossmann (M.), 1896 Essais de Paléoconchologie comparée (2ème livraison), p. 1-179 
 Cossmann (M.), 1896 Mollusques éocèniques de la Loire-Inférieure. Tome 1, fascicule 2. Bulletin de la Société des Sciences Naturelles de l'Ouest de la France, t. 6, vol. 4, p. 180-246

eocaenica
Gastropods described in 1896